Peter Cunningham or Pete Cunningham may refer to:

Pete Cunningham (kickboxer) (born 1963), Canadian kickboxer and martial arts actor
Peter Cunningham (British writer) (born 1816), British writer
Peter Cunningham (footballer) (1906–1934), Scottish soccer player
Peter Cunningham (Irish writer) (born 1947), Irish writer
Peter Cunningham (photographer), American photographer
Peter Cunningham (priest) ( – 1805), English cleric and poet
Peter Cunningham (racing driver) (born 1962), American race car driver
Peter L. Cunningham (1814–1899), mayor of Norwalk, Connecticut
Peter Miller Cunningham (1789–1864), Scottish naval surgeon and pioneer in Australia
W. Pete Cunningham (1929–2010), American politician from North Carolina